Young  American Bodies is an American web series, which originally premiered on Nerve.com and aired on IFC and at IFC.com in the United States until 2009.

Considered to be the first Mumblecore television series, each short episode looks into the intersecting love lives of six twenty-somethings in Chicago and was known for its honest portrayal of sexuality.

The series was produced and directed by Joe Swanberg and Kris Swanberg, and featured actors Greta Gerwig, Lynn Shelton and Karl Jacob.

Cast and crew

Major characters

 Mollie Leibovitz as Maggie
 Joe Swanberg as Ben
 Kris Williams as Dia
 Frank V. Ross as Kelly
 Ryan Smith as Noah
 Karl Jacob as Ted
 Nikita Word as Natalie

Crew

Episodes

Season 1 (2006)

Season 2 (2008)

Season 3 (2009)

References

External links

American drama web series